Robert Ricks is a meteorologist at the National Weather Service in Slidell, Louisiana, where he serves as lead forecaster. Ricks is best known for the strongly worded bulletin he issued prior to the arrival of Hurricane Katrina, warning of "Devastating damage ... water shortages will make human suffering incredible by modern standards". The bulletin predicted "Most of the area will be uninhabitable for weeks, perhaps longer". Some national news agencies thought the bulletin was a hoax.

Ricks has been stationed at the National Weather Service Forecast Office for the New Orleans/Baton Rouge area since 1994. He has also worked at NWS offices in Jackson, Mississippi, Dodge City Kansas, and the Lower Mississippi River Forecast Center in Slidell, LA as well as for the private sector in Houston, Texas. He often serves as event coordinator during severe weather events that impact the New Orleans area.

When asked how much of him was in the wording, Ricks explained "I was trying to find things to actually take out. And I said, "I cannot find it in myself to take these out, because they seem very valid for the situation." And I came from the experience of going through Betsy and Camille myself in the Lower Ninth Ward."  Ricks began crafting the statement based on a template created by meteorologists Barry Goldsmith and Walt Zaleski at the NWS Tampa Bay area office in 1999-2000, but updated it for the New Orleans area and beyond as the storm progressed.

Ricks' forecast came to fruition for several members of his family. His aunt, Teresa Ricks' Waveland, Mississippi home was washed off its foundation by the storm surge.  His stepmother, Cathy Ricks' New Orleans home in the Poydras suburb was destroyed.  Another aunt, Sylvia Guerin's Chalmette restaurant was impacted by an explosion resulting from a gas leak during the hurricane.  Ricks' uncle's home was submerged under  of water when a nearby levee failed.

In 2010, Ricks was among those honored with the Operational Achievement Group Award by the National Weather Association for his contributions to agencies responding to the Deepwater Horizon accident with forecasts of wind/waves supporting burn and oil recovery missions and containment operations.

Ricks lives with his wife of 29 years on the north shore of Lake Pontchartrain. He has two children and two grandchildren who live in the area.

On April 25, 2014, television channel France 24 aired a follow-up program about Hurricane Katrina. It interviewed Robert Ricks, then still working at the New Orleans weather station. He gave as his opinion that the city had safeguarded against a storm of the same magnitude as Katrina, but was still vulnerable to a, "category 4- or category 5- type threat.”

References

Year of birth missing (living people)
Living people
American meteorologists
National Weather Service people
People from New Orleans